Lug is a village in the municipality of Jablanica, Bosnia and Herzegovina. It is located along the Neretva river.

Demographics 
According to the 2013 census, its population was 380.

References

Populated places in Jablanica, Bosnia and Herzegovina